Gnathocera is a genus of beetles belonging to the family Scarabaeidae.

Description
The larvae live in soil. The adult beetles are usually found in the high grass.

Distribution
This genus is widespread in the Afro-tropical region.

Species
 Gnathocera abessinica Moser, 1911
 Gnathocera allardi Ruter, 1964
 Gnathocera angolensis Westwood, 1854
 Gnathocera angustata Kolbe, 1892
 Gnathocera basilewskyi Ruter, 1958
 Gnathocera bilineata Kraatz, 1886
 Gnathocera bomokandi Burgeon, 1932
 Gnathocera bonsi Ruter, 1991
 Gnathocera bourgoini Ruter, 1964
 Gnathocera convexiuscula Kraatz, 1899
 Gnathocera cruda Janson, 1877
 Gnathocera flavovirens Kolbe, 1892
 Gnathocera garnieri Allard, 1993
 Gnathocera hirta Burmeister, 1842
 Gnathocera hyacinthina Janson, 1885
 Gnathocera impressa (Olivier, 1789)
 Gnathocera katentania Burgeon, 1932
 Gnathocera kudrnai Rataj, 2000
 Gnathocera lamottei Ruter, 1958
 Gnathocera leleupi Ruter, 1958
 Gnathocera luluana Basilewsky, 1949
 Gnathocera lurida Janson, 1877
 Gnathocera maculipennis Kraatz, 1898
 Gnathocera marginata Janson, 1885
 Gnathocera nigrolineata Arrow, 1922
 Gnathocera overlaeti Burgeon, 1939
 Gnathocera pauliani Allard, 1988
 Gnathocera pilicollis Kolbe, 1901
 Gnathocera pilosa Kraatz, 1897
 Gnathocera pubescens Janson, 1885
 Gnathocera pulchripes Schlürhoff, 1942
 Gnathocera quadripunctata Kraatz, 1898
 Gnathocera royi Ruter, 1958
 Gnathocera sericea Moser, 1911
 Gnathocera sericinitens Bates, 1884
 Gnathocera submarginata Fairmaire, 1893
 Gnathocera sulcata Kolbe, 1901
 Gnathocera trivittata (Swederus, 1787)
 Gnathocera truncata Janson, 1900
 Gnathocera usafuana Kolbe, 1901
 Gnathocera valida Janson, 1884
 Gnathocera varians Gory & Percheron, 1833
 Gnathocera vestita Kolbe, 1901
 Gnathocera villosa Janson, 1877

References

 Biolib

Cetoniinae
Scarabaeidae genera
Taxa named by William Kirby (entomologist)